X-Men: Reign of Apocalypse is a video game for the Game Boy Advance featuring the X-Men comic book characters. It was designed by Digital Eclipse and released by Activision in 2001.

Plot

Story
Returning from their journey in the Mojoverse, the X-Men return to the destroyed remains of their home, the X-Mansion. They soon discover that they are in an alternate universe under the control of the evil mutant, Apocalypse. The X-Men must battle their way through Apocalypse's army of Sentinels and Mutants in order to return to their universe.

Setting
The setting takes place in an alternate universe controlled by Apocalypse, with backgrounds that stay true to the X-Men comics. The X-Mansion, the Blackbird, Genosha and other familiar locations are present in the game.

Characters
The playable X-Men roster consists of Wolverine, Cyclops, Storm, and Rogue. Each character has a different super power that gives them a unique playstyle. Boss enemies include classic villains from the comics such as Blob and Magneto. Other X-Men from the 616 Marvel Universe, such as Colossus and Nightcrawler, are allies of Apocalypse in this alternate universe and must be defeated.

Gameplay
X-Men: Reign of Apocalypse is a side-scrolling action beat 'em up with 12 distinct levels. Each level has waves of enemies plus a mutant boss who all must be defeated to progress to the next stage. Players must defeat enemies to earn points which can be spent at the end of each stage to improve the character's strength, vitality, or mutant power. All playable characters share the same basic attacks, but each one has a unique special ability: Wolverine has claws that excel in close-range combat, Rogue has a charge ability, Storm controls tornado projectiles, and Cyclops has long-range optic blasts.

Multiplayer
Up to two players can play cooperatively in campaign mode, or play against each other in a competitive mode to pit two of the playable characters in battle.

Reception

X-Men: Reign of Apocalypse received mixed reviews upon release. Aggregate review websites Metacritic and GameRankings scored the game 61 out of 100 and 59.34%, respectively. The reviewer at GameSpot recommended the portable game to X-Men and beat 'em up game fanatics, but was disappointed by the simplistic gameplay and ending.  Nintendojo concluded that it was "a fun game that ends much too quickly".

References

External links
X-Men video games on Marvel.com

2001 video games
Activision beat 'em ups
Cooperative video games
Game Boy Advance games
Game Boy Advance-only games
Video games based on X-Men
Video games featuring female protagonists
Superhero video games
Video games set in Africa
Video games set in Antarctica
Video games set in Canada
Video games set in New York City
Video games set in New York (state)
Video games set in San Francisco
Video games set in Paris
Video games set on the Moon
Digital Eclipse games
Multiplayer and single-player video games
Video games developed in the United States